Broken River is a river in the South Island of New Zealand. It drains into the Waimakariri River due north of the town of Springfield.

The Broken River Ski Area is in the catchment area of the river. The Broken River Cave is on Cave Stream, a tributary of Broken River.

See also
Rivers in New Zealand

Rivers of Canterbury, New Zealand
Rivers of New Zealand